Segula Island is an island in the Rat Islands archipelago of the western Aleutian Islands, Alaska.  It consists of a Holocene stratovolcano, called Segula Volcano.

The island supports a large auklet colony; one of only nine in the Aleutian Island chain.

Climate 
Along with the other Rat Islands, Segula Island has a cool, wet, marine climate. Frequently, it snows from October to May off and on.

Wildlife 
Segula hosts vegetation typical to the Aleutian Islands, largely moss, lichens, and heath, in addition to sedges, grass, fungi, various herbs, fern, and flowering plants such as Narcissus anemone, lupines, and orchids.

References 

Rat Islands
Islands of Alaska
Islands of Unorganized Borough, Alaska